is a Japanese professional footballer who plays as a midfielder for Scottish Premiership club Celtic and the Japan national team.

Early life
Hatate was born in Suzuka, Mie Prefecture and played youth football for FC Yokkaichi before studying at Shizuoka Gakuen High School and later, the Juntendo University. While studying at the Juntendo University, it was announced that Hatate would sign for J1 League side Kawasaki Frontale in 2020, when he graduates. He joined Frontale in 2018 as a designated special player and was approved to continue as a designated player in 2019.

University
Rated as one of the country's most promising university prospects, Hatate was called up to the Japanese University Team to play at the 2017 Summer Universiade, where he scored three goals, helping Japan to win the title for the sixth time. He also featured at the 2018 AFC U-23 Championship, however he did not score in this competition.

Hatate helped Japan to the 2019 Summer Universiade title in July 2019, scoring two goals, including one against Brazil in the final.

Club career
Hatate made his debut at the end of the 2019 J1 League season, coming on as a substitute for Hiroyuki Abe in a 2–1 win over Hokkaido Consadole Sapporo.

The following season, he would go on to establish himself in the Kawasaki Frontale team. Due to his versatility, he was utilised mostly as a left wing-back, but also played as an attacking midfielder, and on both wings. He finished the season with six goals in 38 appearances in all competitions, as Frontale went on to win the 2020 J1 League.

Celtic
On 31 December 2021, Hatate was announced to have signed a four-and-a-half year deal with Scottish Premiership club Celtic for a fee believed to be in the region of £1.4 million. On 17 January 2022, he made his debut in a 2–0 win against Hibernian and was awarded man of the match. On 2 February, Hatate recorded two goals and one assist in a 3–0 Old Firm win against Rangers.  Hatate would go on to help Celtic win the 2021–22 Scottish Premiership league title that year.

In the following season, Hatate made his UEFA Champions League debut against Real Madrid at Celtic Park. Although Celtic lost the match 3–0, Hatate was praised highly by fans and media outlets alike for his performance against Los Blancos.

On 24 December 2022, due to the unavailability of Josip Juranović and an injury to Anthony Ralston - Hatate started as a right-back in their Scottish Premiership home fixture against St Johnstone, where Hatate would go on to score a brace in a 4–1 home win for Celtic. Hatate was given another man of the match award for this showing, with his ability to be versatile in a number of positions being highlighted by Celtic manager Ange Postecoglou.

International career
In 2019, he gained international recognition for his performances at the Toulon Tournament, where he scored two goals to help Japan to the final, where they were eventually defeated on penalties by Brazil. Hatate missed Japan's final penalty, handing the title to Brazil.

Having represented Japan at youth level, Hatate was called up to the Japan U24 team for the 2020 Olympics. On 29 March 2022, Hatate made his debut for Japan against Vietnam in a World Cup Qualifier. 

Despite his form at Celtic during the 2022-23 season, Hatate was not included in the Japan squad for the 2022 FIFA World Cup in Qatar. This came as a surprise to many supporters and media outlets at the time, where Japan manager Hajime Moriyasu justified his decision by saying: "We selected players who will be on the same wavelength as a team, who will be able to move and link up together, who through their organisation will be able to make use of their individual strengths".

Other work 
Hatate has written articles for Japanese website From the Athlete, where he reflects on his footballing career so far. His first piece was published shortly after his debut for Celtic, where he spoke about his development at Kawasaki Frontale and his time with Japan under-23s at the 2020 Summer Olympics in Tokyo.

Career statistics

Club

International

Honours
Kawasaki Frontale
J1 League: 2020, 2021
Emperor's Cup: 2020
Japanese Super Cup: 2021

Celtic
Scottish Premiership: 2021–22
Scottish League Cup: 2022–23

Individual
 J.League Best XI: 2021

References

External links

1997 births
Living people
Association football people from Mie Prefecture
Juntendo University alumni
Japanese footballers
Japanese expatriate footballers
Japan youth international footballers
Association football defenders
Association football midfielders
Association football forwards
Association football utility players
J1 League players
Scottish Professional Football League players
Kawasaki Frontale players
Celtic F.C. players
Japanese expatriate sportspeople in Scotland
Expatriate footballers in Scotland
Medalists at the 2018 Asian Games
Footballers at the 2018 Asian Games
Asian Games medalists in football
Asian Games silver medalists for Japan
Universiade medalists in football
Universiade gold medalists for Japan
Medalists at the 2019 Summer Universiade
Footballers at the 2020 Summer Olympics
Olympic footballers of Japan